A Nait The or Massage Practitioner is a 1922 Burmese black & white silent comedy short film.

Cast
Par Gyi
Khin Khin Nu

Release
It was shown on 14 November 1922. This short film is 4000 feet long. Censor no. is 1533.

References

1922 films
1922 comedy films
Burmese silent films
Burmese black-and-white films
Burmese comedy films
Silent comedy films